John Hammond, D.D (1640–1723) was a priest in England.

Hammond was educated at Christ Church, Oxford. He was Chaplain to Dr. William Fuller, Bishop of Lincoln; Rector of Chalfont St Giles, a Canon of Lincoln and Archdeacon of Huntingdon from 1673 to 1701. He died on 25 May 1723.

Notes

Alumni of Christ Church, Oxford
17th-century English Anglican priests
18th-century English Anglican priests
Archdeacons of Huntingdon
1640 births
1723 deaths